The Babine are an indigenous group in New Brunswick, Canada.

Babine may also refer to:

 Babine, British Columbia, Canada
 Babine (alcoholic drink)
 Babine (film)

See also
 Babine-Witsuwitʼen language